is a sports venue in Niigata, Japan, and was the home of the Albirex Niigata football team until they moved to the Big Swan in 2001. It is used mostly for association football matches, but also for rugby union and athletics. The stadium is an athletics stadium which has hosted major Japanese athletic events, including the 1964 National Sports Festival. Albirex Niigata Ladies also use the stadium.

See also
 Hakusan Park, the park in which the stadium is located

References

External links
  

Athletics (track and field) venues in Japan
Football venues in Japan
Buildings and structures in Niigata (city)
Sports venues in Niigata Prefecture
Albirex Niigata
Sports venues completed in 1936
1936 establishments in Japan